The fourth season of the historical drama television series Vikings premiered on February 18, 2016 on History in Canada.  The series broadly follows the exploits of the legendary Viking chieftain Ragnar Lothbrok and his crew, and later those of his sons. The first season of the series begins at the start of the Viking Age, marked by the Lindisfarne raid in 793.

The fourth season consists of a double-season order of twenty episodes, split into two parts of ten episodes; The first half concluded on April 21, 2016. The second half premiered on November 30, 2016. The season follows the battles between Ragnar and Rollo in Francia, Bjorn's raid into the Mediterranean, and the Viking invasion of England. It concluded in its entirety on February 1, 2017.

Cast

Main
 Travis Fimmel as King Ragnar Lothbrok, the head of the Earldom of Kattegat who was crowned king after Horik's death
 Katheryn Winnick as Queen Lagertha, a shield-maiden and Ragnar's ex-wife; she controls the Earldom of Hedeby calling herself Earl Ingstad. Later, she becomes queen of Kattegat.
 Clive Standen as Duke Rollo, a warrior and Ragnar's brother; he was granted the title of Duke of Normandy by Emperor Charles.
 Gustaf Skarsgård as Floki, a gifted shipbuilder and a friend of Ragnar's. He is on trial for the murder of Athelstan
 Alexander Ludwig as Bjorn Ironside, Ragnar and Lagertha's son, who has a relationship with Torvi
 Nathan O'Toole portrays a young Bjorn Ironside, appearing in Ragnar's visions.
 Alyssa Sutherland as Queen Aslaug, Brynhildrs daughter and Ragnar's second wife
 Ben Robson as Earl Kalf, a Viking warrior who shares the control of Hedeby with Lagertha (part 1)
 Lothaire Bluteau as Emperor Charles of West Francia (part 1)
 John Kavanagh as The Seer, the seiðrmann of Kattegat
 Linus Roache as King Ecbert of Wessex, the ruthless king of Wessex
 Peter Franzén as King Harald Finehair, a Viking ambitious to become the first King of Norway
 Jasper Pääkkönen as Halfdan the Black, Harald's violent younger brother
 Kevin Durand as Harbard, a charismatic wanderer and storyteller (part 1)
 Alex Høgh as Ivar the Boneless, the fourth son of Ragnar and Aslaug (part 2, guest part 1)
 James Quinn Markey portrays a young Ivar the Boneless
 Marco Ilsø as Hvitserk, second son of Ragnar and Aslaug (part 2, guest part 1)
 Stephen Rockett portrays a young Hvitserk
 David Lindström as Sigurd Snake-in-the-Eye, third son of Ragnar and Aslaug (part 2, guest part 1)
 Elijah O'Sullivan portrays a young Sigurd Snake-in-the-Eye
 Jordan Patrick Smith as Ubbe, eldest son of Ragnar and Aslaug (part 2, guest part 1)
 Luke Shanahan portrays a young Ubbe
 Moe Dunford as Prince Aethelwulf, son of King Ecbert (part 2, recurring part 1)
 Jonathan Rhys Meyers as Bishop Heahmund, a very religious warrior priest (part 2)

Recurring

 George Blagden as Athelstan, a deceased Anglo-Saxon monk and friend of Ragnar's. He was killed by Floki towards the end of the previous season and appears in Ragnar and Ecbert's visions.
 Dianne Doan as Yidu, Queen Aslaug's new slave
 Maude Hirst as Helga, Floki's long-suffering lover and wife
 Owen Roe as Count Odo of Paris
 Edvin Endre as Erlendur, son of King Horik and second husband of Torvi
 Georgia Hirst as Torvi, wife of Erlendur and, later, wife of Bjorn
 Morgane Polanski as Princess Gisla of West Francia, daughter of Emperor Charles, wedded to Duke Rollo
 Rosalie Connerty as Angrboda, daughter of Floki and Helga
 Huw Parmenter as Roland, Count Odo's first-in-command and Therese's brother
 Karen Hassan as Therese, Roland's sister and Count Odo's mistress
 Amy Bailey as Queen Kwenthrith of Mercia
 Jennie Jacques as Princess Judith of Northumbria, daughter of King Aelle, wedded to Aethelwulf
 Seán T. Ó Meallaigh as Prudentius of Troyes, a monk serving at the court of King Ecbert
 Des Carney as Waerferth the Scout, serving King Ecbert
 Conor Ó Hanlon as infant Alfred, Princess Judith and Athelstan's son
 Philip O'Sullivan as Bishop Edmund, serving at the court of King Ecbert
 Niall Cusack as Abbot Lupus, serving at the court of Emperor Charles
 Ivan Kaye as King Aelle of Northumbria
 Ruby O'Leary as Gyda, Ragnar and Lagertha's daughter. She appears in Ragnar's visions.
 Josefin Asplund as Astrid, Lagertha's lover and advisor
 Ida Marie Nielsen as Margrethe, one of Queen Aslaug's slaves
 Anton Giltrap as Guthrum, Jarl Borg and Torvi's son
 Charles Last as William, first son of Rollo and Gisla
 Isaac O'Sullivan as child Alfred, Princess Judith and Athelstan's son
 André Eriksen as Odin, appearing in visions
 Sinead Gormally as Tanaruz, a Moorish child
 Charlie Kelly as Egil, an agent of King Harald
 Cathy White as Queen Ealhswith of Northumbria, King Aelle's wife
 Caitlin Scott as Princess Blaeja, daughter of King Aelle
 Jack Nolan as Earl Jorgensen, a Swedish warlord
 Sophie Vavasseur as Princess Ellisif, the object of King Harald's affections
 Gary Buckley as Earl Vik, Princess Ellisif's husband
 Gary Murphy as Bishop Unwan, serving at the court of King Aelle

Guest
 Søren Pilmark as Stender, a farmer whose family was killed in Wessex. He was killed by Ragnar and appears in his dreams.
 Steve Wall as Einar, a scheming troublemaker. He is killed by Lagertha.
 Frankie McCafferty as Sinric, a polyglot drifter
 Cillian O'Sullivan as Eirik, a Viking warrior in Paris, former second in command of Rollo. He is betrayed by him and killed by Franks.
 Robban Follin as Berserker, an assassin recruited by Erlendur and Kalf to kill Bjorn. He is killed by Bjorn himself.
 Declan Conlon as Lord Wigstan, Queen Kwenthrith's second cousin and the head of the Royal Family of Mercia
 John Kavanagh as Pope Leo IV
 Adam McNamara as Thorhall, a Danish Viking who delivers bad news to Queen Aslaug and Bjorn
 Liam Clarke as Gudmund, a settler in Ragnar and Ivar's party
 Ed Murphy as Gardar, a settler in Ragnar and Ivar's party
 Jack Walsh as John Scotus Eriugena, a theologian
 Cameron Hogan as Magnus, Queen Kwenthrith and King Ragnar's supposed son
 Josh Donaldson as Hoskuld, a Viking warrior of great skill
 Tamaryn Payne as Widow Ordlaf, a lady of Sherborne

Episodes

Production

Development
Vikings is an Irish-Canadian co-production presented by Metro-Goldwyn-Mayer. The fourth season was developed and produced by Octagon Films for the first sixteen episodes, TM Productions for the last four episodes, and Take 5 Productions. Morgan O'Sullivan, Sheila Hockin, Sherry Marsh, Alan Gasmer, James Flynn, John Weber, and Michael Hirst are credited as executive producers. This season was produced by Keith Thompson for the first eight and for the last four episodes, and Sanne Wohlenberg for the ninth to sixteenth episodes. Bill Goddard and Séamus McInerney are co-producers.

The production team for this season includes casting directors Frank and Nuala Moiselle, costume designer Joan Bergin, visual effects supervisor Dominic Remane, stunt action designers Franklin Henson and Richard Ryan, composer Trevor Morris, production designer Mark Geraghty, editors Aaron Marshall for the first, fourth, seventh, fifteenth and eighteenth episodes, Christopher Donaldson for the second, fifth and eighth episodes, Tad Seaborn for the third, sixth, ninth, eleventh, thirteenth, sixteenth and nineteenth episodes, and Don Cassidy for the tenth, twelfth, fourteenth, seventeenth and twentieth episodes, and cinematographers PJ Dillon for the first eight and last four episodes, and Owen McPolin for the ninth to sixteenth episodes.

Music

The musical score for the fourth season was composed by Trevor Morris in collaboration with Einar Selvik. The opening sequence is again accompanied by the song "If I Had a Heart" by Fever Ray.

The soundtrack album was released on December 27, 2019 by Sony Classical Records. An additional original song not included in the album is "Snake Pit Poetry", written by Einar Selvik and performed by Hilda Örvarsdóttir, and featured in "All His Angels". The track was released as a single on October 20, 2017, together with a second version solely performed by Selvik.

Additional non-original music by Norwegian music group Wardruna is featured in the episodes "In the Uncertain Hour Before the Morning" and "Crossings". The featured tracks are "Bjarkan", "Laukr" and "Algir — Tognatale".

Reception

Critical response
Both parts of the fourth season of Vikings received very positive reviews. The review aggregator website Rotten Tomatoes reported a 92% approval rating, with an average rating of 8.3/10 based on twelve reviews. The critical consensus reads: "Vikings returns for another season of fantastic performances, epic battles, and sharp writing sure to please its barbarous hordes of fans."

Notes

References

External links
 
 

2016 Canadian television seasons
2017 Canadian television seasons
2016 Irish television seasons
2017 Irish television seasons
Split television seasons
Cultural depictions of Harald Fairhair